Akita Shoten is a Japanese publishing company, which has published several manga series in their magazines.

1960s

1969
The Abashiri Family
The Crater
Dororo

1970s

1970
Sensuikan Super Nine Nine

1971
Babel II

1972
Dokaben
Gun Frontier

1973
Black Jack
Cutie Honey

1974
Cosmoship Yamato

1975
Bride of Deimos
Eko Eko Azarak
Grendizer
Uchu Enban Daisenso

1976
Crest of the Royal Family
From Eroica with Love

1977
His Name Is 101
Space Pirate Captain Harlock

1979
The Book of Human Insects
Mobile Suit Gundam

1980s

1981
A, A Prime

1982
Plawres Sanshiro

1983
Dai Kōshien

1987
Lady!!
Ogenki Clinic

1988
Darkside Blues
Vampire Princess Miyu

1990s

1990
Crows

1991
Baki the Grappler
Inochi no Utsuwa

1992
Samurai Legend

1993
Super Radical Gag Family

1994
Apocalypse Zero
Canon

1995
A.I. Revolution
Dokaben Professional Baseball

1996
Musashi Number 9

1998
Alien Nine

1999
Fire Candy
New Grappler Baki: In Search of Our Strongest Hero

2000s

2000
Battle Royale
By the Sword
Hanaukyo Maid Team
Love Junkies
Nanaka 6/17
Three in Love
With the Light

2001
Cantarella
Dejiko's Champion Cup
Eiken
Ikebukuro West Gate Park
S-CRY-ed
Seven of Seven

2002
Bogle
Demon City Shinjuku
Hungry Heart: Wild Striker
Koi Koi Seven
No Bra
Noodle Fighter Miki
Original! Super Radical Gag Family
Saint Seiya Episode.G
Worst
X-Day

2003
Alien 9 Emulators
Battle Royale II: Blitz Royale
Crossroad
Fūma no Kojirō: Yagyū Ansatsuchō
Gaki Rock
The Knockout Makers
Princess Tutu
Shigurui
Tenshi Ja Nai!!

2004
After School Nightmare
Cutie Honey
Dokaben Superstars
Fuan no Tane
Junk: Record of the Last Hero
My-HiME
Oyayubihime Infinity
Ray the Animation

2005
Baki: Son of Ogre
Black Jack: the Dark Surgeon
Crown
Densha Otoko: The Story of a Train Man Who Fell in Love With A Girl
My-Otome
Train Man: Go, Poison Man!
Squid Girl

2006
Cat Paradise
Franken Fran
KimiKiss: Sweet lips
Mitsudomoe
Muteki Kanban Musume N
The Qwaser of Stigmata
Saint Seiya: The Lost Canvas
Saint Seiya: Next Dimension
Samurai Harem: Asu no Yoichi
Shinobi Life
Sundome

2007
Blue Drop: Maiorita Tenshi
Blue Drop: Tenshi no Bokura
Blue Drop: Tenshi no Itazura
El Cazador de la Bruja
Doki Doki Majo Shinpan!
Fuan no Tane Plus
Nekogami Yaoyorozu
Squid Girl
Volume 0: Aiolos

2008
Aki Sora
Black Rose Alice
Demon King Daimao
Rescue Me!
Yowamushi Pedal

2009
Hana no Zubora-Meshi

2010s

2010
Always! Super Radical Gag Family
Ibitsu
Sugarless

2011
Maoyū Maō Yūsha: Oka no Mukō e
Saint Seiya: The Lost Canvas - Anecdotes

2012
Dokaben Dream Tournament
Magical Girl Apocalypse

2013
Le Fruit de la Grisaia: Sanctuary Fellows
Saint Seiya: Saintia Shō

2014
Saint Seiya Episode.G: Assassin
Shounen Princess: Putri Harimau Naoko
The Way of Baki

2015
The House in Fata Morgana: Anata no Hitomi o Tozasu Monogatari

2016 
 Beast Complex
 Beastars

2020s

2021 
 Tonari no Onee-san ga Suki

Unsorted
The Devil of the Earth
Ikebukuro West Gate Park R

References

Akita Shoten
 
Akita Shoten